Jana Novotná and Arantxa Sánchez Vicario were the defending champions but they competed with different partners that year, Novotná with Mary Joe Fernández and Sánchez Vicario with Chanda Rubin.

Rubin and Sánchez Vicario lost in the first round to Alexandra Fusai and Nathalie Tauziat.

Fernández and Novotná lost in the quarterfinals to Naoko Kijimuta and Miho Saeki.

There was no result for the tournament due to rain. The final would have seen Lori McNeil and Helena Suková take on Nicole Arendt and Manon Bollegraf.

Seeds
Champion seeds are indicated in bold text while text in italics indicates the round in which those seeds were eliminated.

 Gigi Fernández /  Natasha Zvereva (semifinals)
 Mary Joe Fernández /  Jana Novotná (quarterfinals)
 Lori McNeil /  Helena Suková (final)
 Nicole Arendt /  Manon Bollegraf (final)

Draw

External links
 1997 Direct Line International Championships Doubles Draw

Doubles
Doubles 1997